Dmitry Rubnenko (born 30 July 1983) is a retired Belarusian footballer. He ended his career at the age of 25 due to persistent injuries.

Honours
BATE Borisov
Belarusian Cup winner: 2005–06

References

External links
Player profile at BATE Borisov website
Profile at teams.by

1983 births
Living people
Belarusian footballers
FC Energetik-BGU Minsk players
FC BATE Borisov players
FC Vitebsk players
FC Savit Mogilev players
Association football midfielders